Robert Hoddle (21 April 1794 – 24 October 1881) was a surveyor and artist. He is best known as the surveyor general of the Port Phillip District (later known as the Australian state of Victoria) from 1837 to 1853, especially for creation of what is now known as the Hoddle Grid, the area of the CBD of Melbourne.  He was also an accomplished artist and depicted scenes of the Port Phillip region and New South Wales. Hoddle was one of the earliest-known European artists to depict Ginninderra, the area now occupied by Canberra, Australia's National Capital.

Biography

Early life
Hoddle, the son of a bank clerk for the Bank of England, was born in Westminster, London. He  became a cadet-surveyor in the British army in 1812. Hoddle worked in the Ordnance Department and took part in the trigonometrical survey of Great Britain. Hoddle then sailed for the Cape Colony, South Africa in 1822 where he worked on military surveys.

Surveying in Australia
Hoddle migrated to the Australian colonies, arriving in Sydney, New South Wales, aboard the William Penn in July 1823. Governor Brisbane appointed him assistant surveyor under Surveyor-General John Oxley. Hoddle spent the next twelve years in Queensland and later still in New South Wales where he surveyed the sites for the  towns of Berrima and Goulburn as well as Bell's Line of Road in the Blue Mountains. Between 1830 and 1836, Hoddle made several visits to the rural district now occupied by the Australian Capital Territory (A.C.T.), where he surveyed property boundaries.  Squatters were urgently pressing for government surveyors to legalise their rural holdings. Hoddle's field book indexes the history of the aforementioned areas and pastoralists— George Palmer, Robert Campbell and Hamilton Hume.

Hoddle arrived in Port Phillip, the future site for Melbourne, in March 1837 in company with Governor Bourke, as senior surveyor with his assistants D'Arcy and Darke. He was to take charge of the surveying work which had been begun by Robert Russell, who many years later claimed to have surveyed the first grid of streets. Whether Hoddle surveyed from scratch or used Russell's initial survey has been the subject of controversy, but they both followed the then standard grid layout and alignment. Hoddle's survey, a copy of which survives in the Public Record Office of Victoria, is dated 25 March 1837, and covered the area from Flinders Street to Lonsdale Street, and from Spencer Street to Spring Street. The principal streets were one and a half chains wide (30 m), and at the insistence of Bourke, smaller east–west streets a half chain wide (10 m) were inserted, intended to furnish back entrances (but quickly became frontages in their own right). This layout came to be known as the Hoddle Grid.

In 1837, at the same time as Melbourne, Hoddle laid out the first blocks of Williamstown, but without rear laneways. In 1838 he laid out Geelong, including narrow laneways as in the Melbourne grid. His layouts for each were typical of the time, being square or rectangular grids, aligned with features such as rivers or waterfront, surrounded by government reserve for future expansion, government buildings, ports and the like.

Hoddle subdivided the land beyond the angled city grid on a one-mile north–south grid, creating much larger allotments. The areas closest to the city in what is now Fitzroy, Collingwood and Richmond, were soon subdivided by speculators creating the sometimes quite narrow streets and irregular grid pattern. Hoddle's subdivision of East Melbourne was far more regular.

Hoddle was in favour of the principal entry streets being a generous width of 60m, which he applied to what are now Melbourne's tree-lined boulevards, such as St Kilda Road, Victoria Parade, Elizabeth Street in Carlton, and the roads branching off that: Royal Parade and Flemington Road. He advocated widening the other existing major roads without success. In 1853 he was gently asked to retire in favour of Andrew Young, who is credited with the subdivisions of Carlton, North Fitzroy, and South Geelong that include formal parks, squares and crescents.

Artist in ink and watercolours
Robert Hoddle is the earliest-known European artist to have depicted the A.C.T. area. Many of his works are held in the National Library of Australia, State Library of Victoria and the State Library of New South Wales. 

Some of the paintings he made during this time are held at the National Library of Australia. They include:
Ginninginderry, i.e. Ginninderra, Plains, New South Wales; watercolour
Ginninginderry, i.e. Ginninderra, Plains; watercolour

Additional works by Hoddle include:
View from Limestone Hill called Campbells Hill, New South Wales, March 1832; watercolour
The seven day's in the Week's Occupation of the Australians, hunting, 1835; ink wash
Unidentified coastal landscape, New South Wales, 1; watercolour
Unidentified coastal landscape, New South Wales, 2; watercolour
View from Illawarra Range en route to Kiama, 1830; watercolour

Later life
William Lonsdale appointed Hoddle as auctioneer at the first sale of crown land on 1 June 1837, at which he sold half-acre (0.2 ha) allotments for £18 to £78, considered at the time a very high price. Hoddle's commission was £57 12s. 7d., from which he bought two allotments for himself at a cost of £54. Hoddle built himself a house on the corner of Bourke and Spencer Streets where, in retirement, he tended his trees, played organ and flute and translated Spanish.

In 1840, Hoddle was granted a gratuity of £500 as he was leaving the survey department on account of ill-health. However, after a few months holiday he recovered his health, took up his duties again, and the gratuity was not paid to him. He later did valuable work in the country districts of Victoria, became Surveyor General of Victoria in 1851, and retired in July 1853 with a pension of £1000 a year. He had bought in 1837 the block of land in Elizabeth Street, Melbourne, on which the Commonwealth Bank of Australia now stands, for a comparatively small sum, and he became a wealthy man. After his retirement he took an interest in the Old Colonists' Association and was elected a life governor in December 1873.

Personal life
He was married twice and left a widow and children.

Death
He died at his residence on the north east corner of Bourke and Spencer Street, a lot he bought at one of the first land sales, on 24 October 1881.

Legacy
Hoddle Street, East Melbourne
Hoddles Creek, Victoria, a small town located East of Melbourne.
Hoddles Creek, a tributary of the Yarra River.

References

External links 

 Colonial Secretary's papers 1822-1877, State Library of Queensland- includes digitised correspondence and letters written by Hoddle to the Colonial Secretary of New South Wales

Further reading 

English surveyors
Australian surveyors
People from Westminster
1794 births
1881 deaths
Surveyors General of Victoria
English emigrants to colonial Australia
Settlers of Melbourne
Australian landscape painters